The 2002–03 Czech Cup was the tenth season of the annual football knock-out tournament of the Czech Republic. Winners FK Teplice qualified for the 2003–04 UEFA Cup.

Teams

Preliminary round

|}

Round 1

|}

Round 2

|}

Round 3

|}

Round 4

|}

Quarterfinals

|}

Semifinals

|}

Final

See also
 2002–03 Czech First League
 2002–03 Czech 2. Liga

References

External links
 Official site 
 Czech Republic Cup 2002/03 at RSSSF.com

2002–03
2002–03 domestic association football cups
Cup